José Issa (born 28 May 1942) is a Bolivian footballer. He played in four matches for the Bolivia national football team in 1967. He was also part of Bolivia's squad for the 1967 South American Championship.

References

External links
 

1942 births
Living people
Bolivian footballers
Bolivia international footballers
Association football goalkeepers
Club Aurora players
C.D. Jorge Wilstermann players
Sportspeople from Cochabamba